"These Are the Days of Our Lives" is a song by the British rock band Queen. Although credited to the whole band, it was largely written by their drummer Roger Taylor, and is the eighth track on the band's 1991 album Innuendo.

The song was released as a single in the United States on Freddie Mercury's 45th birthday, 5 September 1991, and as double A-side single in Ireland and the United Kingdom on 9 December, in the wake of Mercury's death, with the Queen track "Bohemian Rhapsody". The double A-side debuted at number one on the UK Singles Chart and remained there for five weeks, topped the Irish Singles Chart for six weeks, and reached number 16 in Germany. The song was awarded a Brit Award for British Single of the Year in 1992. In 1999, it was included on Queen's compilation album Greatest Hits III.

Ron Hart of Rolling Stone writes, "the conga-driven synth ballad "These Are the Days of Our Lives" is Innuendo most significant single, given that it was released on Mercury's 45th birthday, and that its video marked the last time his fans were able to see the singer alive, as it was filmed in May of 1991 during the final stages of his battle with AIDS. A ballad in the vein of "Love of My Life," it was a song that carried a significant amount of weight given the frailty of Mercury's appearance in the black-and-white video, later compounded when unreleased colour footage from the filming emerged in Days of Our Lives."

Background
Reminiscing on the past, Roger Taylor penned the song as Freddie Mercury's health was deteriorating. As a teenager Taylor had known Mercury since the late 1960s when they worked together at Kensington Market in London before the two (along with Brian May) founded Queen in 1970. The opening chorus in the song reminisces, with "Those were the days of our lives", while the second chorus refers to the present, "Cause these are the days of our lives".

Music video
The video was the last Queen video to feature Freddie Mercury in person before his death on 24 November 1991. Rudi Dolezal and Hannes Rossacher of DoRo Productions filmed the music video at studios in London on 30 May 1991.

Mercury, Roger Taylor and John Deacon were present at the shoot; Brian May was filmed later in the year and added in digitally, as he was out of the country on a promotional tour at the time of the shoot. Following rumours about Mercury's health, the video was filmed and released in black-and-white to hide the full extent of his illness.

In the video, Mercury wears a waistcoat with pictures of cats that was made for him by Queen costume designer Diana Moseley. With his farewell look straight at the camera as the song ends, Mercury whispers "I still love you", directed to his fans, which are his last words on camera. Video director Dolezal had been told beforehand to keep things speedy due to Mercury's ailing condition, but before shooting wrapped, Mercury requested one more take for the last lyrics of the song: "Those days are gone now but one thing's still true / When I look and I find I still love you". Jordan Runtagh for People writes, "On the last line, he summons all his strength for a final heroic pose before collapsing into himself with a soft laugh. Staring through the camera, he whispers a final "I still love you" before snapping his fingers, walking out of frame with a flourish". Dolezal comments, "In these last few seconds of that song, he gives us a résumé of his whole life: 'I was a big superstar, but don't take it too seriously.' And then, 'I still love you,' which is to the fans. Then he walks out of life. Even in his last moments, he planned his exit artistically. That's how he wanted it to be."

The US version of the video features animation produced by Walt Disney Studios, as Queen's North American record label, Hollywood Records, is a subsidiary of The Walt Disney Company. Another video version was released in 1992 to promote the Classic Queen compilation album in the US, combining old footage of the band from 1973 to 1991 plus the performances of the band from the US aired video.

Live performances and covers
The song was first played live on 20 April 1992 at the Freddie Mercury Tribute Concert, sung by George Michael and Lisa Stansfield. The live version was included on the 1993 EP Five Live, credited to 'George Michael with Queen & Lisa Stansfield'.

The song was played on the 2005/2006 Queen + Paul Rodgers tours with vocals provided by Roger Taylor. On stage the song was accompanied by a video of the band in their early days in Japan, including many shots focusing on past band members Freddie Mercury and John Deacon.

The song was used on 1 July 2007 at the Concert for Diana held at the redeveloped Wembley Stadium, London in honour of Diana, Princess of Wales, who had died almost 10 years earlier. At the end of the concert, a video montage of Diana as a child was presented while the song was playing in the background. A cover version by Petula Clark is included on her 2008 compilation album Then & Now.

Track listings
First Issue

Second Issue

Personnel
Queen
 Freddie Mercury – vocals, keyboards
 Brian May – electric guitar, backing vocals
 Roger Taylor – drums, percussion, keyboards, backing vocals
 John Deacon – bass guitar
with:
 David Richards – keyboards, programming

Accolades

Charts

Weekly charts

Year-end charts

Certifications

Release history

References

External links
 Official YouTube videos: Queen + Paul Rodgers (live), at Freddie Mercury Tribute Concert (with George Michael and Lisa Stansfield)
 Lyrics at Queen official website

1990 songs
1991 singles
Black-and-white music videos
Brit Award for British Single
Christmas number-one singles in the United Kingdom
Hollywood Records singles
Irish Singles Chart number-one singles
Parlophone singles
Queen (band) songs
Sentimental ballads
Songs written by Roger Taylor (Queen drummer)
UK Singles Chart number-one singles